In the National Basketball Association (NBA), a game seven is the final game of a best-of-seven series in the NBA playoffs. Based on the playoffs format arrangement, it is played in the venue of the team holding home-court advantage for the series. The necessity of a game seven is not known until the outcome of game six is determined, assuming that a series reaches that far. In other words, game seven is the only one in a series that is not guaranteed more than one game in advance. Due to the decisive nature of game sevens, they are often "played more conservatively" and receive more media and fan attention.

The NBA Finals has always employed a best-of-seven series format. The Conference (or Division) Finals have used this format since 1958; the Conference (or Division) Semifinals since 1968; and the First Round since 2003. During the 1947 and 1948 playoffs, in which teams from different divisions met each other in the opening rounds, the first-place teams from each division played a best-of-seven series against each other before one advanced to the league finals. The other teams in the playoffs competed against each other in three best-of-three series to determine the other spot in the finals.

Since the inception of the NBA, 145 game sevens have been played. Of those, six went into overtime, and one into double overtime. Thirty-four game sevens have been won by the road team. Every active NBA franchise has played in at least one game seven. There have been twelve playoff seasons in which no game sevens were played: 1947, 1949, 1950, 1953, 1956, 1958, 1967, 1972, 1983, 1985, 1989, 1991, and 1999. The 1994, the 2014 and the 2016 postseasons hold the record for most game sevens played, with five. In 1979, 1981, 1988, 2005, 2006, 2009, 2012, 2018 and 2020, four game sevens were played. The Los Angeles Lakers and New York Knicks both hold the record for most game sevens played in a single postseason, having played three game sevens in 1988 and 1994, respectively, the maximum possible at that time.

Key

All-time game sevens

All-time standings

Reoccurring game seven matchups
(*) – Number of overtime periods played in the seventh game.

Notes

 The home-and-away format in every round of the playoffs is the 2–2–1–1–1 format (the team with the better regular season record plays on their home court in games one, two, five and seven). The format of the finals from 1984–2013 used the 2–3–2 format (the team with the better regular season record plays on their home court in games one, two, six and seven). In the past, there have been several other formats used in the playoffs.
 Won as the designated road team at a neutral-site game.

References
General

Specific

National Basketball Association playoff games
National Basketball Association lists
National Basketball Association Finals